is a Japanese actor, singer, and tarento.

Biography 
Kamiji graduated from Yokohama Senior High School. He belonged to the baseball club while in school, and played catcher. He and Daisuke Matsuzaka played together for one year, and when Matsuzaka joined the club, it was Kamiji who first practiced with him.  Kamiji assumed uniform number 2 from autumn of his junior year, but handed it over to freshman Yoshio Koyama (currently with the Chunichi Dragons) because of a serious injury to his right elbow during practice.

After high school, Kamiji attempted to enter university on a sports scholarship, but gave it up after the injury to his elbow.  He then decided to make his way as an actor.  He made his debut in the serial drama "LXIXVXE" on TBS in 1999.  By this time, Daisuke Matsuzaka had made world headlines in the pros, and it was reported in several Japanese sports journals that his "former wife" had debuted as an actor.  Kamiji acquired experience be appearing in bit parts in many TV dramas and movies.

His big break was in a guest appearance on "Quiz Hexagon II", a Japanese celebrity game show, in which he continues to provide comic relief; he is also a regular guest on Fuji TV's Stupid Cara.

Along with two of his fellow regulars on Quiz! Hexagon II, Takeshi Tsuruno and Naoki Nokubo, Kamiji was a member of a musical unit called Shuchishin. The trio often performed on air on Hexagon II for roughly one year, after which the group was dissolved. Since then, Kamiji has recorded and released music under the simply . All three of his singles released in 2009 charted, with "Himawari" reaching No. 8 for the year, "Tanpopo/Kaizokusen/Sono Kobushi" at No. 17, and "Ichō" at No. 37.

In 2008, Kamiji's blog was officially recognized by the Guinness Book of World Records for the most unique visitors to the page in a 24-hour period.

Kamiji's father, Katsuaki Kamiji, is Yokosuka City Congressman.

Kamiji married to an unnamed woman in 2015. On January 7, 2017, he gave birth to his first son.

Filmography/Discography

Dramas 
 Gokusen 1 (2002)
 Binbo Man (2008)
 Rookies (2008)
 Scrap Teacher (2008)
 Celeb and Binbo Taro (2008)
 Gyne (Gynecology) (2009)
 Tenchijin (2009), Kobayakawa Hideaki
 Tobo Bengoshi (2010)
 Kuroshoin no Rokubei (2018)
 Galápagos (2023)

Movies 
Crows Zero (2007)
Drop (2007)
Crows Zero 2 (2009)
Samurai Hustle (2014)
The Vancouver Asahi (2014)
Let Me Eat Your Pancreas (2017)
Project Dream: How to Build Mazinger Z's Hangar (2020)

Varieties 
Quiz! Hexagon II

Singles 
 – March 11, 2009
 – June 24, 2009
 – November 4, 2009
 – March 10, 2010
 – July 28, 2010
 – November 10, 2010
 – July 20, 2011
 – August 3, 2011
 – November 9, 2011
"Baby Baby" (Baby Baby) – March 7, 2012
"Viva! Nossa Nossa" (VIVA!Nossa Nossa; "Hooray! Ours Ours") – October 31, 2012
 – February 27, 2013
 – August 7, 2013
 – December 4, 2013

Albums 
 – December 16, 2009
 – February 2, 2011
 – April 4, 2012
Ano.. Omatsuri Desu Kedo. ("Well.. I Wish I Was at That Festival") – May 30, 2012
 – April 17, 2013

DVDs

Clothing brand 
He owned a clothing brand called U-Suke which is selling school uniform.

References

External links 
 
 Kamiji's Blog

People from Yokosuka, Kanagawa
Japanese male actors
1979 births
Living people